Patrick Frank Surtain Sr. (born June 19, 1976) is an American former professional football player who was a cornerback for 11 seasons in the National Football League (NFL).  He played college football for the Southern Miss Golden Eagles.  He was selected by the Miami Dolphins in the second round of the 1998 NFL Draft, and also played for the Kansas City Chiefs. In January 2023, he was hired as the defensive backs coach at Florida State University.

Early years
Surtain attended high school at Edna Karr High School, where he completed 44 of 97 passes for 753 yards with seven touchdowns and rushed 137 times for 784 yards with 12 touchdowns as a quarterback. He also played baseball and ran track, and was also a member of the state title basketball and football teams in his senior year.

College career
Surtain attended the University of Southern Mississippi, where he was a four-year letterman and two-year starter. In his junior year, Surtain started all 11 games and accumulated 84 tackles, 8 passes defended and six interceptions.

Professional career

Miami Dolphins
Surtain was drafted by the Miami Dolphins in the second round of the 1998 NFL Draft. He played for the Dolphins from 1998–2004 and was selected to the Pro Bowl three times in 2002, 2003, and 2004. He finished with 344 tackles, 6.5 sacks, and 29 interceptions in 108 career games with the Dolphins.

Kansas City Chiefs
In April 2005 the Dolphins traded Surtain to the Kansas City Chiefs for a second round pick in the 2005 NFL Draft. After the trade the Chiefs re-signed him to a seven-year $50.8 million deal.

Surtain was released by the Chiefs on February 24, 2009. He finished his career with the team with 192 tackles, one sack, and eight interceptions in 55 games.

Coaching career

Miami Dolphins
Surtain was hired as a defensive assistant coach for the Miami Dolphins on February 18, 2022.

Surtain was hired as the defensive backs coach for the Florida State Seminoles on January 10, 2023.

NFL career statistics

Regular Season

Personal life
In 2016, Surtain became head coach at American Heritage School. His son, Patrick Surtain II, who played for him at American Heritage, was one of the top-ranked high school football players of the class of 2018 and played college football for the Alabama Crimson Tide. Like his father, Patrick II plays cornerback, and was drafted No. 9 overall in the 2021 NFL draft by the Denver Broncos. He is married to Michelle Surtain (née Webster) and has 3 children, Patrick II, Paris, and Parker.

References

External links
 Kansas City Chiefs profile

1976 births
Living people
American football cornerbacks
Kansas City Chiefs players
Miami Dolphins players
Southern Miss Golden Eagles football players
High school football coaches in Florida
American Conference Pro Bowl players
Sportspeople from New Orleans
Coaches of American football from Louisiana
Players of American football from New Orleans
African-American coaches of American football
African-American players of American football
21st-century African-American sportspeople
20th-century African-American sportspeople
Miami Dolphins coaches